A couque suisse is a viennoiserie sweet roll, somewhat similar to a Danish pastry. Couques suisses are available internationally. They are also similar to Belgian buns.

They have been a common street food for Belgium's white collar workers since 1900, mostly consumed as a lunchtime snack, either on the street or at no-frills pubs.

References

Sweet breads
Belgian cuisine
Street food